Dennis di Cicco (born 1950) is an American amateur astronomer and a discoverer of minor planets, who lives in New England.

He has discovered 60 numbered asteroids from his backyard observatory in Sudbury, Massachusetts (IAU code: 817). He was a member of the editorial staff of Sky and Telescope magazine from 1974 until his resignation as senior editor in June 2014. His special interests include astronomical photography and the history of astronomical photography, telescope making, and astronomical observing. During 1978 and 1979 he was the first person to successfully photograph the analemma, making 48 separate exposures on a single piece of film during a 12-month period. The project is described in the June 1979 issue of Sky & Telescope. The asteroid 3841 Dicicco was named after him.

Di Cicco conducted observations and calculations to determine the exact time and date of Ansel Adams’ famous photograph, Moonrise, Hernandez, New Mexico.

He grew up in Hanover, Massachusetts.

List of discovered minor planets

See also 
 Moonrise, Hernandez, New Mexico

References 
 

1950 births
20th-century American astronomers
Discoverers of asteroids

Living people